Roberto González-Monjas (born February 23, 1988 in Valladolid, Spain) is a Spanish classical violinist and conductor.

Education 
He studied at the Mozarteum University of Salzburg with Igor Ozim and at the Guildhall School of Music and Drama in London with David Takeno. He has been very much influenced by musical contact with John Corigliano, Ana Chumachenco, Rainer Schmidt, Sergey Fatkulin, Reinhard Goebel, Mark Stringer, Leonidas Kavakos, Gábor Takacs-Nagy, Christian Tetzlaff, the Hagen Quartet, András Schiff and Ferenc Rados.

Conductor and soloist 
Since the 2019/2020 season, Roberto González-Monjas is the Chief conductor of the Dalasinfoniettan in Falun, Sweden.
In July 2020 the Musikkollegium Winterthur announced Roberto González-Monjas as their new Chief Conductor, effective from Season 2021/2022.

He has conducted and played as a soloist with well-known orchestras such as the Mozarteum Orchestra Salzburg, Ulster Orchestra, Malaysian Philharmonic Orchestra, Verbier Festival Chamber Orchestra, Orchestre National Bordeaux Aquitaine, New World Symphony (orchestra), the Orquesta Sinfónica de Castilla y León (of which he is an Artist-in-residence), Camerata Salzburg and the Berliner Barock Solisten.
In May 2018 he premiered "Colorfields", Violin Concerto No. 2 written and dedicated to him by composer Richard Dubugnon.

Concertmaster and chamber musician 
Since the 2013/14 season, Roberto González-Monjas is the concertmaster of the Orchester Musikkollegium Winterthur and Primarius of the Winterthurer Streichquartett in a 50% capacity. In March 2020 it was announced that he would be stepping down from this position at the end of the 2020/2021 Season. From February 2014 until July 2020 he was the concertmaster of the Orchestra dell'Accademia Nazionale di Santa Cecilia in Rome.

He has played as a guest concertmaster with the Philharmonia Orchestra, the Berlin Radio Symphony Orchestra, Les Musiciens du Louvre Grenoble, the Manchester Camerata, the Bavarian Kammerphilharmonie and the Camerata Salzburg.
While his usual recital partner is Kit Armstrong, he also performs with pianists Alexander Lonquich, Yuja Wang and Louis Schwizgebel. He has also joined music formations with Andreas Ottensamer, Nicolas Altstaedt, Ian Bostridge, Ana Chumachenco, Alessandro Carbonare, Christian Zacharias and Ray Chen.

Teacher and educator 
Roberto González-Monjas is the co-founder and Artistic Director of Iberacademy in Medellín, Colombia, a non-profit organization which aims at creating an efficient and sustainable model of musical education in Latin America, focusing on vulnerable segments of population and supporting highly talented young musicians. He also works with other educational institutions such as the New World Symphony (orchestra) in Miami and the Verbier Festival Junior Orchestra. He is a Violin Professor at the Guildhall School of Music and Drama in London.

Instrument 
He plays a Giuseppe Guarneri ‘filius Andreae’ violin from around 1710. Its purchase was made possible thanks to five families from the city of Winterthur and the Rychenberg Foundation. He also owns a violin made by Stephan von Baehr in 2011.

Discography 
His debut recording features Wolfgang Amadeus Mozart′s Haffner Serenade and Othmar Schoeck′s Serenade Op. 1 with the Musikkollegium Winterthur, and was released in October 2017 by Claves Records. He also contributed to Reinhard Goebel′s recording of Johann Sebastian Bach′s Brandenburg Concerti with the Berliner Barocksolisten for Sony Classical. His last recording featured Symphonies and Flute Concertos by Carl Philipp Emanuel Bach.

References

External links 
Official Website
Profile on IMG Artists
Roberto González-Monjas on Facebook

Swiss classical pianists
1988 births
Living people
People from Valladolid
Alumni of the Guildhall School of Music and Drama
Mozarteum University Salzburg alumni
21st-century classical pianists